The name Igme has been used in the Philippines by PAGASA in the Western Pacific.
Typhoon Mindulle (2004) (T0407, 10W, Igme)- a powerful storm that affected the Philippines, Taiwan and China.
Typhoon Fung-wong (2008) (T0808, 09W, Igme) - a system that made landfall in Taiwan as a Category 2.
Typhoon Tembin (2012) (T1214, 15W, Igme) - interacted with nearby Typhoon Bolaven, causing it to make a U-turn and head for South Korea.
Typhoon Chaba (2016) (T1618, 21W, Igme) - a powerful super typhoon that struck South Korea in October 2016.
Typhoon Bavi (2020) (T2008, 09W, Igme) - a system that formed in the Philippine Sea and threatened South Korea but made landfall on North Korea.

Pacific typhoon set index articles